Henbury is a civil parish in Cheshire East, England.  It contains 25 buildings that are recorded in the National Heritage List for England as designated listed buildings, all of which are at Grade II.   This grade is the lowest of the three gradings given to listed buildings and is applied to "buildings of national importance and special interest".  The parish contains the village of Henbury, and Henbury Hall with its grounds, but is otherwise rural.  Most of the listed buildings are houses, cottages, farmhouses, farm buildings and associated structures.  Also listed are buildings associated with Henbury Hall.  The other listed structures include a church and its lychgate, a pinfold, and a milepost.

See also

Listed buildings in Gawsworth
Listed buildings in Macclesfield
Listed buildings in Nether Alderley
Listed buildings in Over Alderley
Listed buildings in Siddington

References
Citations

Sources

 

Listed buildings in the Borough of Cheshire East
Lists of listed buildings in Cheshire